Geisinger Medical Center is a hospital in Danville, Pennsylvania. It is the primary hospital for the Danville-based Geisinger Health System, a primary chain of hospitals and clinics across northeastern and central Pennsylvania.

Geisinger Life Flight, a five-helicopter medevac system, is based at the hospital.

Hospital for Advanced Medicine
On February 9, 2010 Geisinger Medical Center opened the Hospital for Advanced Medicine (HFAM). Also in the building:

HFAM 8 Medicine/Surgery with Telemetry - Opened in 2010, this floor provides general medical and surgical care to patients who are in need of telemetry.
HFAM 7 Acuity Adaptable Care Unit - Focuses on patient care related to cardiac surgery, extracorporeal membrane oxygenation (ECMO), and thoracic surgery, opened in 2010.
HFAM 6 Orthopaedic Surgery - Opened in 2013, this floor focuses on all aspects of inpatient post-orthopaedic and surgical care, with a special focus on total joint replacement patients. The floor boasts a comprehensive gymnasium used for inpatient rehabilitation following surgery.
Since 2015 Geisinger Medical Center is a certified Extracorporeal Life Support Organization (ELSO) center for supporting patients requiring extracorporeal membrane oxygenation (ECMO).

See also
Geisinger Health System

References

Buildings and structures in Montour County, Pennsylvania
Hospitals in Pennsylvania
Trauma centers